The Veiled Rebecca or The Veiled Rebekah is a 19th century sculpture carved out of marble in  Italian neoclassical style by the sculptor Giovanni Maria Benzoni.The sculpture is also referred as The Veiled Lady in several records. It depicts a biblical figure of Rebecca placed on a marble pedestal.

Originally several copies of the sculpture were made by Benzoni in two different sizes. Presently, the location of five sculptures are identified. (High Museum of Art in Atlanta, Georgia. Listed in the catalog as The Veiled Rebekah and dated 1864. Berkshire Museum, Pittsfield, Massachusetts. Dated c. 1866.Detroit Institute of Arts, Detroit, Michigan. This smaller version (113 cm tall) is listed in the catalog as The Veiled Lady and dated 1872.Salar Jung Museum, Hyderabad, India. Dated 1876 (three years after Benzoni's death). Cedarhurst Center for the Arts, Mount Vernon, Illinois.) The one located in Detroit Institute of Arts, is the smaller version.

The same is noted in 19th-century English art journal :

Description
Benzoni executed principal version of the work in 1863 for Robert Henry Winttie of London.The sculpture depicts an Old Testament scene, where Rebecca lays eyes on her husband Issac for the first time.  Rebecca's head is bowed and her gaze is lowered as she secures her veil indicating demure modesty, although her other hand partially opens up in a welcoming gesture.The fringed veil drapes over her face, head and shoulder, and dangled unevenly above her feet. Her translucent attire further highlights the contour of her body.The illusion of a diaphanous veil and clinging dress created by the craftsmanship of Benzoni are the most noteworthy and skillful aspects of the sculpture.

History 
As per the records of a bulletin from Detroit Institute of Arts, Detroit Michigan, 37 versions of the composition was made in two sizes whereas  Historical Dictionary of Neoclassical Art and  Architecture by Alison Lee Palmer states that there are five copies of  the sculpture. Location of the five versions of the statues mentioned by Alison Lee Palmer have been mentioned above.

Salarjung Museum, Hyderabad India 
Salarjung I Mir Turab Ali Khan Bahadur acquired the sculpture during his trip to Italy in Rome.During the same visit he also acquired the famous wooden sculpture, Mephistopheles and Margaretta. The Veiled Rebecca was displayed was originally displayed in the Chini Khana inside the Dewan Devdi, Hyderabad. Chini Khana or chinese room was a unique room, where all the walls were covered with antique chinese plates and cups and saucers and the silver plates were displayed in shelves.  In 1951 the devdi was converted into Salarjung Museum and the sculpture stood in its original position but in 1968 it was moved into the new Salarjung Museum and Dewan Devdi was gradually demolished over the years.

Style 
The Veiled Rebecca is an example of the neoclassical naturalist style, popular during the 19th century.  The Veiled Lady, or Rebecca shows how Antonio Canova's and other Neoclassical sculptors' work had an influence on Benzoni as well as how well-versed he was in earlier eighteenth-century sculptural style. As Boström noted, veiled figures first appeared in post-classical art in the eighteenth century. Canova produced various female figures with translucent attire and drapes in the nineteenth century, including Hebe. Later Milanese sculptor Raffaelle Monti created Seated Veiled Woman  displayed at London's Great Exhibition of 1851 and then Veiled Woman  in 1854 to continued to explore this veiled female form. Benzoni was acquainted with Monti and was present in London in 1851.

Veiled women were a popular sculptural motif among Benzoni and his peers in 19th-century Italy for a number of reasons. The first was that these works highlighted the artistry of the sculptor since achieving the illusion that stone is fabric clinging to a body requires a high level of skill. Secondly, a veiled woman had become an allegory for Italian unification.

Gallery

See also
 Vestal Virgin Tuccia, 1743 sculpture
 Modesty, 1752 sculpture
 Veiled Christ, 1753 sculpture
 Veiled Vestal 1847 sculpture
 The Veiled Virgin, mid-19th century sculpture
 The Veiled Nun, c. 1863 sculpture

Notes

References

 
 

Sculptures in Italy
Neoclassical sculptures
1866 sculptures
Veiled statues
Collections of the Salar Jung Museum